Warspear Online is a mobile cross-platform massively multiplayer online role-playing game (MMORPG) by Russian studio AIGRIND LLC. It supports different mobile platforms: iOS, Android, Windows Mobile, Symbian and Windows based PCs and laptops. First launch of the game was in 2008 and it was based on P2P model, in 2010 it was redesigned. In March, 2011 an update called Legacy of Berengar was launched. The game became F2P.

, it is available in Russian, English and Vietnamese languages. Warspear Online became the winner in category “Best Multiplayer Game 2013” hosted by Best App Ever Awards.

Prehistory of Warspear Online tells us about divine Spear which kept balance in the world Arinar. But a powerful serpent Garahan once decided to seize the Spear to get more power to rule the whole world. And the War for Spear began.

Servers 
Seven servers are available:
 EU-Emerald - for European players
 RU-Topaz, RU-Amber, RU-Ruby - for Russian players
 SA-Pearl - for Southeast Asian players
 US-Sapphire - for American players
 BR-Tourmaline - for Brazilian players

References

External links 
 

Massively multiplayer online role-playing games
2008 video games
Android (operating system) games
IOS games
Linux games
MacOS games
Video games developed in Russia
Windows games
Windows Phone games
Fantasy massively multiplayer online role-playing games
Official Forum